, born December 30, 1974, in Kyoto) is a Japanese R&B singer, also known as just Ryohei. He debuted as "山本領平" (written in kanji) under Warner Music Japan on 2003 with single "Almost There". Prior to that, in November 2002, he was featured on a track "Why Not?" by Fantastic Plastic Machine. In 2006 he shortened his name to just "Ryohei" (written in Roman letters) and transferred to the label Rhythm Zone. He is known for his collaborations with m-flo, being featured on tracks such as "Miss You" and "Summer Time Love".

For a time, Ryohei was one of the most popular artists on iTunes Japan, with his single 'So Fly' reaching Np. 1.

His last release as a singer was in 2007. Since then, he has written for artists including Koda Kumi.

Discography

Album 
Album Title: Take Over

Release Date: September 23, 2004

Label: Warner Music Japan 

Tracks:
 Intro
 Take Over
 Speedway
 Set Free
 この空に
 Can't You See?
 Game We Played
 Almost There
 Rainy Days
 Fantasy
 Why Not, Darling?
 Purify
 Moon Sexy
 Believe Me
 Let It Flow
 Outro

Album Title: ReListen

Release Date: February 7, 2007

Features: M-Flo, Lisa

Label: Rhythm Zone

Tracks:
 Intro
 Onelove (feat. Verbal (M-Flo))
 ReListen (feat. Lisa)
 あなたの手　
 World　
 Like This　
 Upside Down　
 you said...　
 Just Want　
 the LIGHT　
 In My Arms　
 Gift　
 Outro
Bonus Tracks
 After The Love Has Gone
 A Night To Remember
 Sincere

Singles 
1st Single: Onelove
Release Date: March 8, 2006
Features: M-Flo
Tracks: 
 onelove
 Just Want
 onelove [instrumental]
 Just Want [instrumental]

2nd Single: the LIGHT
Release Date: July 26, 2006
Tracks: 
 the LIGHT
 Like This
 the LIGHT [instrumental]
 Like This [instrumental]

3rd Single: you said... 
Release Date: November 1, 2006
Tracks: 
 you said...
 One Sugar Dream -Ryohei version-
 Special acoustic live medley at JZ Brat on 16 October 2006
 you said...[instrumental]

References

External links 
 Ryohei Official Site 
 TFL.ORG APPROVED FANLISTING 
 Artimage Official Site  - An English biography page is available.
 Official profile at Warner Music Japan 

Avex Group artists
Musicians from Kyoto Prefecture
Living people
1974 births
Toyota Tsusho
21st-century Japanese singers
21st-century Japanese male singers